The American Journal of Political Science is a journal published by the Midwest Political Science Association. It was formerly known as the Midwest Journal of Political Science. According to the Journal Citation Reports, the journal has a 2016 impact factor of 5.044, ranking it 1st out of 165 journals in the category "Political Science". According to SCImago Journal & Country Rank it ranks 3rd best in the field of Political Science and Sociology. Also by other authors it is ranked among 5 best journals in political science. The journal publishes articles on all areas of political science.

See also 
 William G. Jacoby
 List of political science journals
 2010 conservatism-psychoticism correlation error

Further reading

References

External links
 

Political science journals
Quarterly journals
Wiley-Blackwell academic journals
English-language journals
Publications established in 1956
Political science in the United States
1956 establishments in the United States